Arhopala corinda is a species of butterfly belonging to the lycaenid family described by William Chapman Hewitson in 1869. It is found in  Southeast Asia (Peninsular Malaya, Sumatra, Borneo, Burma, Mergui, Langkawi and the Philippines).

Subspecies
Arhopala corinda corinda (Philippines)
Arhopala corinda corestes Corbet, 1941 (southern Burma, Mergui, Langkawi)
Arhopala corinda acestes de Nicéville, [1893] (Peninsular Malaysia, Sumatra, Borneo)

References

Arhopala
Butterflies described in 1869
Butterflies of Asia
Taxa named by William Chapman Hewitson